Kim Min-jung also known as Kim Eun-kyeong (Hanja:, born 8 August 1988) is a South Korean judoka.

She competed at the 2016 Summer Olympics in Rio de Janeiro, in the women's +78 kg.

References

External links
 
 

1988 births
Living people
South Korean female judoka
Olympic judoka of South Korea
Judoka at the 2016 Summer Olympics
Universiade medalists in judo
Judoka at the 2014 Asian Games
Judoka at the 2018 Asian Games
Asian Games silver medalists for South Korea
Asian Games bronze medalists for South Korea
Asian Games medalists in judo
Medalists at the 2014 Asian Games
Medalists at the 2018 Asian Games
Universiade silver medalists for South Korea
Medalists at the 2015 Summer Universiade
21st-century South Korean women